On the Avenue is a 1937 American musical film directed by Roy Del Ruth and starring Dick Powell, Madeleine Carroll, Alice Faye, George Barbier, and The Ritz Brothers. Many of the songs were composed by Irving Berlin.  Many of the plot details (with a reversal of the male and female roles) were used in Let's Make Love. Initially, the movie was called Out Front.

Plot
Gary Blake stars in a new show, On the Avenue, with Mona Merrick. The show contains a satire on the richest girl in the world, Mimi Carraway. Mimi and her father are in the audience on opening night and feel insulted. She goes backstage and tries to get Gary to take the skit out of the show. He refuses and calls her a "bad sport".

Shocked by the remark, Mimi decides to make a date with Gary. They spend the entire evening together and, by morning, have fallen in love. He finally agrees to revise the skit so it can no longer hurt the Carraways. Mona is in love with Gary and is furious when she hears about Gary's date with Mimi. When the Carraways appear to see the revised sketch, she changes it, without Gary's knowledge, making it worse than before. The Carraways decide to file suit against Gary.

To get back at him, Mimi buys the show from the producer and embarrasses Gary by hiring a paid audience to walk out on the show. Word leaks out to the press and makes Gary the laughingstock of New York. Furious, he tears up his contract, refusing to work with Mimi. Soon, Mimi becomes engaged to Arctic explorer Frederick Sims. On her wedding day, Mona arrives and tells Mimi that she, not Gary, changed the skit. Mimi runs out of the wedding and goes to city hall with Gary to be married.

The film's action is interspersed with songs from the play, including Berlin's songs "He Ain't Got Rhythm," and "Let's Go Slumming On Park Avenue."

Cast
 Dick Powell as Gary Blake
 Madeleine Carroll as Mimi Caraway
 Alice Faye as Mona Merrick
 The Ritz Brothers as themselves
 George Barbier as Commodore Caraway
 Alan Mowbray as Frederick Sims
 Cora Witherspoon as Aunt Fritz
 Walter Catlett as J.J. Dibble
 Douglas Fowley as Eddie Eads
 Joan Davis as Miss Katz
 Stepin Fetchit as Herman 'Step'
 Sig Ruman as Herr Hanfstangel (as Sig Rumann)
 Billy Gilbert as Joe Papaloupas

Partial soundtrack
 I've Got My Love to Keep Me Warm (1937)
 Music and Lyrics by Irving Berlin
 Sung by Dick Powell and Alice Faye in the show
 This Year's Kisses (1937)
 Music and Lyrics by Irving Berlin
 Sung by Alice Faye with piano accompaniment at rehearsal
 You're Laughing at Me (1937)
 Music and Lyrics by Irving Berlin
 Sung by Dick Powell with the studio orchestra
 The Girl on the Police Gazette (1937)
 Music and Lyrics by Irving Berlin
 Sung by Dick Powell with a barbershop quartet
 Cheek to Cheek (1935)
 Music and Lyrics by Irving Berlin
 Partially sung by Harry Ritz in the "He Ain't Got Rhythm" number
 He Ain't Got Rhythm (1937)
 Music and Lyrics by Irving Berlin
 Performed by Alice Faye, The Ritz Brothers and chorus in the show

Reception and accolades
Writing for Night and Day in 1937, Graham Greene gave the film a good review, noting the film's astute direction and succinctly summarizing it as "a good film with some charming songs". Greene's only significant complaint was that of the performance given by Carroll which Greene described as evoking "the less endearing traits of a young elephant", "her stupendous coquetry", and her "intense proboscine whispers". Speaking for the audience, Greene claims that "we don't want weight or fidelity in a musical comedy".

The film was nominated for the American Film Institute's 2006 list AFI's Greatest Movie Musicals.

References

Green, Stanley (1999) Hollywood Musicals Year by Year (2nd ed.), pub. Hal Leonard Corporation  page 65

External links
 
 
 

1937 films
1937 musical comedy films
1937 romantic comedy films
American musical comedy films
American romantic comedy films
American romantic musical films
American black-and-white films
1930s English-language films
Films directed by Roy Del Ruth
20th Century Fox films
Films scored by Irving Berlin
Films scored by Cyril J. Mockridge
1930s American films